= Jeff Dolbare =

American politician

Member of the Alabama House of Representatives from the 65th district
- In office November 7, 1990 – August 12, 2004
- Succeeded by: Nick Williams

Personal details
- Born: February 3, 1947 Mobile, Alabama
- Died: August 12, 2004 (aged 57) Bigbee, Alabama
- Party: Democratic

Jeff Dolbare (February 3, 1947 – August 12, 2004) was an American politician who served in the Alabama House of Representatives from the 65th district from 1990 to until his death in 2004.

He died of esophageal cancer on August 12, 2004, in Bigbee, Alabama at age 57.
